William Herbert Connor (March 27, 1895 – ) was a salesman and political figure in Ontario. He represented Hamilton East in the Legislative Assembly of Ontario from 1943 to 1945 as a Co-operative Commonwealth member.

He was born in Hamilton, the son of John Connor and Helen Peters. In 1920, Connor married Lily May Broom. He ran unsuccessfully for a seat in the Ontario assembly as a CCF candidate in 1935.

References 

1895 births
Year of death missing
Ontario Co-operative Commonwealth Federation MPPs
20th-century Canadian legislators